The Football League Trophy 2001–02, known as the LDV Vans Trophy 2001–02 for sponsorship reasons, was the 19th staging of the Football League Trophy, a knock-out competition for English football clubs in Second, Third Division and the Conference. The winners were Blackpool and the runners-up were Cambridge United.

The competition began on 15 October 2001 and ended with the final on 24 March 2002 at the Millennium Stadium in Cardiff.

In the first round, there were two sections: North and South. In the following rounds each section gradually eliminates teams in knock-out fashion until each has a winning finalist. At this point, the two winning finalists face each other in the combined final for the honour of the trophy.

First round
Hull City, Mansfield Town, Oldham Athletic and Tranmere Rovers from the North section all received byes.

Bristol Rovers, Luton Town, Peterborough United and Reading from the South section all received byes.

Northern Section

Southern Section

Second round

Northern Section

Southern Section

Quarter-finals

Northern Section

Southern Section

Area semi-finals

Northern Section

Southern Section

Area finals

Northern Area final

Blackpool beat Huddersfield Town 4–3 on aggregate.

Southern Area final

Cambridge United beat Bristol City 2–0 on aggregate.

Final

Notes

External links
Official website
 

EFL Trophy
Tro